The McCaughey septuplets (born November 19, 1997) are septuplets born to Kenny and Bobbi McCaughey in Des Moines, Iowa. They are the world's first known set of surviving septuplets.

Background, conception and birth
Kenny McCaughey (b. 1969) and Bobbi McCaughey (b. 1968), were residents of the town of Carlisle, Iowa. The McCaugheys had one daughter, Mikayla Marie, born January 3, 1996. While under treatment with ovulation-stimulating Metrodin for infertility, Bobbi became pregnant with seven babies. The McCaugheys declined selective reduction to reduce the number of infants, saying that they would "put it in God's hands". The obstetricians primarily responsible for the medical care of Bobbi and the babies were Karen Drake and Paula Mahone.

The septuplets, four boys and three girls, were born prematurely at the Iowa Methodist Medical Center in Des Moines on November 19, 1997. They were delivered by a scheduled Caesarean section, attended by a team of 40 specialists, all within six minutes.

The babies' names, birth weight, time of birth, and order of birth is as follows:

Two of the septuplets, Alexis and Nathan, have cerebral palsy. Both use walkers to get around, and in November 2005, Nathan had spinal surgery in order to improve his walking abilities.

Media and public response
The birth attracted significant media attention, both positive and negative, including a feature in Time magazine in December 1997. "In the beginning, for every ten letters we would get that were happy for us, we'd get one letter accusing us of exploiting the kids and being selfish to waste the world's resources on a family this big," said Bobbi in a 2007 interview. "Our neighbors never gawked. Here in Carlisle they gave us privacy. But we had complete strangers come around to the back door, knock, and ask if they could hold a baby."

The McCaugheys were the recipients of many donations, including a 5500 ft² (511 m2) house, a van and diapers for the first two years, as well as nanny services, clothes, and even the State of Iowa offering full college scholarships to any state university in Iowa upon their maturity and graduation from high school, also by the Hannibal–LaGrange University in Missouri. President Bill Clinton personally telephoned the McCaugheys to wish them his congratulations. The surviving Dionne quintuplets (Yvonne Dionne, Annette Allard, and Cecile Langlois) wrote an open letter warning the parents to keep the septuplets out of the public eye and not allow them to fall into the same pitfalls as their parents did, but wished them the best of luck in raising them and their personal congratulations; the letter read:

By the time of the septuplets' tenth birthday in 2007, the family was declining most requests for interviews, other than annual stories with the Des Moines CBS television affiliate KCCI and Ladies' Home Journal. Bobbi McCaughey has noted that the level of media attention does not necessarily mean they have granted many interviews, saying, "There was all kinds of stuff in the papers early on but they never actually interviewed us. Most of it is one paper quoting another."

Bobbi and Kenny both occasionally speak at anti-abortion events and continue to oppose selective reduction. Bobbi has been quoted as saying, "Well, come to our house, and tell me which four I shouldn't have had!" The family continues to attend a Baptist church in West Des Moines, Iowa where Kenny serves as a deacon. In 2010, for the septuplets' 13th birthday, a documentary was made by TLC chronicling the event.

Later lives
The septuplets graduated from Carlisle High School in May 2016. Natalie, Kelsey, Nathan and Joel took up scholarships offered by private Hannibal-LaGrange University in Hannibal, Missouri, Kenny and Alexis chose to stay in the Des Moines area and attend Des Moines Area Community College, and Brandon enlisted in the United States Army.

In 2017, the septuplets became aunts and uncles when Mikayla gave birth to a son after getting married in 2015. Natalie was the first of the septuplets to get married, in May 2019. Brandon also got married in August 2019.

By the end of 2022, when the septuplets turned 25, Brandon and Kenny had become fathers.

See also
 List of multiple births
 Suleman octuplets, the first known octuplets to survive infancy
 Halima Cissé, mother of the first known nonuplets to survive infancy

References

Further reading
Taking Sides: Clashing Views on Controversial Issues in Human Sexuality ed by William J. Taverner and Robert T. Francoeur, McGraw-Hill (2000), pages 123–130

External links
 Iowa Methodist Medical Center press release discharging the septuplets

1997 births
American children
Living people
Multiple births
People from Des Moines, Iowa
People from Carlisle, Iowa
People with cerebral palsy
American people with disabilities